The Anadyr Lowlands are a low alluvial plain located in the Chukotka Autonomous Okrug, Far Eastern Federal District, Russia.

Geography
The lowlands are crossed by the Anadyr River in the middle and the Velikaya in the south. They are bound by the Pekulney Range of the Chukotka Mountains to the northwest, west of which lie the Parapol-Belsky Lowlands (Парапольско-Бельская низменность) beyond which rise the Anadyr Highlands, and by the Rarytkin and Ukvushvuynen ranges of the Koryak Mountains to the south.

The mouth of the Anadyr River flows into the Anadyr Gulf of the Bering Sea to the east. The harbor city of Anadyr is located by the mouth on the shore of Onemen Bay in the estuarine area of the river. 

The whole area is dotted with lakes, the largest of which is Lake Krasnoye. Besides the Anadyr, rivers Velikaya, Tumanskaya, Tretya and Kanchalan, flow across the lowlands. A few isolated small mountain ranges rise above the plain, such as the Ushkany, Zolotoy  and Dionysia ranges.

Geologically the Anadyr Lowlands are composed of loose Quaternary sediments, constrained by permafrost.

References

External links

Wetlands in Russia - Vol.4

Plains of Russia
Landforms of Chukotka Autonomous Okrug